The Silberne Peitsche is a Group 3 flat horse race in Germany open to thoroughbreds aged three years or older. It is run over a distance of 1,300 metres (about 6½ furlongs) at Munich in late April or early May.

History
The event was formerly run at Gelsenkirchen, and it used to be held in August. For a period it was contested over 1,400 metres. It was given Listed status in 1983.

The race was extended to 1,450 metres in 1998. It was cut to 1,200 metres in 2000.

The Silberne Peitsche was transferred to Cologne in 2002. It was promoted to Group 3 level and increased to 1,300 metres in 2007. It was moved to the spring in 2010.

The race was switched to Munich in 2012.
In 2014 the Silberne Peitsche is part of the Goldene Peitsche series. The winner of the race gets an invitation to take part in the Goldene Peitsche held in August in Baden-Baden. It was moved to the Baden-Baden spring festival in later May or early June in 2016.

Records
Most successful horse (2 wins):
 Pentathlon – 1967, 1968
 Zünftiger – 1983, 1984
 Wondras – 1990, 1991
 Contat – 2009, 2010
 Shining Emerald – 2015, 2016
 Namos - 2019, 2020

Leading jockey (6 wins):
 Peter Remmert – Campanile (1961), Naretha (1963), Gegenwind (1969), Iffland (1978, div. ii), Aspros (1981), Zünftiger (1984)

Leading trainer (5 wins):
 Heinz Jentzsch – Erdball (1962), Dschingis Khan (1965), Akbar (1975), Colatina (1976), Esclavo (1980)

Winners since 1980

Earlier winners

 1957: Fallott
 1958: Orsini
 1959: Esplanade
 1960: Adlon
 1961: Campanile
 1962: Erdball
 1963: Naretha
 1964: Anatol
 1965: Dschingis Khan
 1966: Wirbel
 1967: Pentathlon
 1968: Pentathlon
 1969: Gegenwind
 1975: Akbar
 1976: Colatina
 1977: Sardica
 1978: i) Llanero, ii) Iffland *
 1979: Belle Fee

* The race was run in two separate divisions in 1978.

See also
 List of German flat horse races

References
 Racing Post:
 galopp-sieger.de – Silberne Peitsche.
 horseracingintfed.com – International Federation of Horseracing Authorities – Silberne Peitsche (2012).
 pedigreequery.com – Silberne Peitsche.

Open sprint category horse races
Sports competitions in Munich
Horse races in Germany